Francioni is an Italian surname. Notable people with the surname include:

Joan Francioni, American computer scientist
Wilmo Francioni (born 1948), Italian road cyclist

See also
Francini
Stadio Domenico Francioni

Italian-language surnames